Mia F Yamamoto born in 1943, is a Los Angeles-based criminal defense attorney and civil rights activist. Mia is a transgender woman of Japanese American descent, born in the Poston War Relocation Center during World War II.

Personal life 
Yamamoto was born in Poston, Arizona in a Japanese-American internment camp during World War II. Her mother was a registered nurse and her father was a lawyer. Her family's experiences in the camp, and her father's subsequent exclusion from the then Whites-only Los Angeles County Bar Association were early factors that shaped Yamamoto's view on the legal system and race relations. Having been born "doing time" due to her race, she developed a sensitivity to clients who found themselves facing convictions and harsh punishments that they otherwise might be able to avoid, had they been white.

Yamamoto and her brothers joined Mexican gangs who were unafraid to stand up to racial injustice. Due to its potential psychological benefits, Yamamoto saw the gang lifestyle as somewhat positive.  Gangs offered her a home away from home, and years later she served as a voice for previous gang members by serving as their trial lawyer.

Yamamoto knew from an early age that her body did not match her identity, but did not know how to express her inner turmoil. While struggling with her gender identity she decided to enlist in the Army, and served from 1966 to 1968. She was awarded the National Defense Service medal, Army Commendation Medal, and Vietnam campaign medal.

After the army, she attended UCLA's School of Law, where she co-founded the Asian Pacific Islander Law Student Association (APILSA).

In 1984 she opened her own practice, and has practiced law since. The salary that she earned as a lawyer helped her afford therapy, which began her journey towards realizing she was a trans woman. However, she was only able to find negative representations of the transgender community. Yamamoto tried to find her way through her transition with the arts, learning to dance and play music. The challenges of transition led her to the realization that she should become an activist for the transgender community.

She married Kimberlee Tellez on September 2, 2015.

Career 
In practice since 1985, Yamamoto has represented thousands of clients in over 200 jury trials, accused of crimes such as murder, sex offences, assault, drug offenses, theft, white-collar crimes, and DUI.

Yamamoto was appointed to serve on the California Judicial Council Task Forces on Jury Improvement and on Fairness and Access in the Courts by the Chief Justice of the California Supreme Court. Yamamoto served as President of the California Attorneys for Criminal Justice in 2001.

In 1999 she presented a lecture for President Clinton's Initiative on "Race and Criminal Justice" at George Washington University. She has been a guest for several panels, classes, and demonstrations for the American Bar Association, Los Angeles County Bar Association International Bridges to Justice, for which she trained criminal defense attorneys in the Republic of China.

She has also been a commentator for print, radio and television news features.

Awards and honors
Yamamoto is the recipient of the Rainbow Key Award by the City of West Hollywood, the Liberty Award by Lambda Legal, and the Harvey Milk Legacy Award by Christopher Street West/LA Pride. She has also been honored by API Equality and the Los Angeles County Human Relations Commission for her advocacy on behalf of the LGBT community. She has received honors from the Criminal Courts Bar Association, National Lawyers Guild, and the Women Lawyers Association of Los Angeles.

Yamamoto is featured in the Silas Howard documentary More than T.

References 

1943 births
Japanese-American civil rights activists
Japanese-American internees
American military personnel of Japanese descent
LGBT lawyers
Transgender women
UCLA School of Law alumni
American LGBT rights activists
LGBT people from Arizona
American LGBT people of Asian descent
Transgender rights activists
Living people